Skyland İstanbul is a mixed-use complex of three skyscrapers in the Huzur neighborhood of the Sarıyer district in Istanbul, Turkey. It comprises the Skyland Residence Tower (284 m / 65 floors), Skyland Office Tower (284 m / 64 floors) and Skyland Hotel Tower (180 m / 28 floors). The buildings were designed by Peter Vaughan of Broadway Malyan.

The project, which had a US$700 million investment cost, started in 2012. The three towers feature 830 residences, 504 office spaces, and a five-star international hotel with 300 rooms and a 550-seat capacity conference hall.

References

External links
 Skyland Istanbul: Official website
 Residence Index: Skyland Istanbul

Skyscrapers in Istanbul
Sarıyer